Poser or variant, may refer to:

a hard problem, a poser
a hard question, a poser

People
Poseur, a person who inauthentically adopts a certain subculture
a person playing a role, a role-play, a fake, an imposter

Bob Poser (1910–2002), U.S. baseball player
Charles Poser (1923–2010), Belgian-American neurologist
Christian Poser (born 1986), German bobsledder
Dániel Póser (born 1990), Hungarian soccer player
Heinrich von Poser (1599–1661), German traveloguer
Lydia Poser (1909–1984), German politician
Rainer Poser (born 1941), German boxer
Sophie Poser (born 1985), German track and field athlete
Susan Poser (born 1963), U.S. academic
Udo Poser (born 1947), German swimmer
William Poser, Canadian-American linguist

Other uses
Poser (software), a 3D computer graphics program distributed by Bondware
Poser (film), 2021 American drama film
Posers (film), 2003 drama film written and directed by Katie Tallo

See also

 Poser criteria, a now deprecated diagnostics for diagnosing multiple sclerosis
 
 Pose (disambiguation)
 Posing (disambiguation)